USA Today named its first All-USA high school football team in 1982. The newspaper has named a team every year since 1982.

In addition, two members of the team are named the USA Today High School Offensive Player and Defensive Player of the Year, respectively. The newspaper also selects a USA Today High School Football Coach of the Year.

Teams

1982 team
Coach of the Year: Steve Klonne (Moeller High School, Cincinnati, Ohio)
Note: Bold denotes Offensive and Defensive Players of the Year, respectively, and ‡ denotes high school juniors

Offense

Defense

1983 team
Coach of the Year: George Curry (Berwick High School, Berwick, Pennsylvania)
Note: Bold denotes Offensive and Defensive Players of the Year, respectively, and ‡ denotes high school juniors

Offense

Defense

1984 team
Coach of the Year: Nick Hyder (Valdosta High School, Valdosta, Georgia)
Note: Bold denotes Offensive and Defensive Players of the Year, respectively, and ‡ denotes high school juniors

Offense

Defense

1985 team
Coach of the Year: Bob Shannon (East St. Louis High School, East St. Louis, Illinois)
Note: Bold denotes Offensive and Defensive Players of the Year, respectively, and ‡ denotes high school juniors

Offense

Defense

1986 team
Coach of the Year: Spence McCracken (Robert E. Lee High School, Montgomery, Alabama)
Note: Bold denotes Offensive and Defensive Players of the Year, respectively, and ‡ denotes high school juniors

Offense

Defense

1987 team
Coach of the Year: Jack McCurry (North Hills High School, Pittsburgh, Pennsylvania)
Note: Bold denotes Offensive and Defensive Players of the Year, respectively, and ‡ denotes high school juniors

Offense

Defense

1988 team
Coach of the Year: Carl Madison (Pine Forest High School, Pensacola, Florida)
Note: Bold denotes Offensive and Defensive Players of the Year, respectively, and ‡ denotes high school juniors

Offense

Defense

1989 team
Coach of the Year: Chuck Kyle (St. Ignatius High School, Cleveland, Ohio)
Note: Bold denotes Offensive and Defensive Players of the Year, respectively, and ‡ denotes high school juniors

Offense

Defense

Accumulated stats

See also
USA Today High School Football Offensive Player of the Year

References

1980s in the United States
High school football trophies and awards in the United States